German submarine U-102 was a Type VIIB submarine of Nazi Germany's Kriegsmarine during World War II.

The U-boat was laid down on 22 May 1939 at the Friedrich Krupp Germaniawerft shipyard at Kiel as yard number 596, launched on 21 March 1940 and commissioned on 27 April under the command of Kapitänleutnant Harro von Klot-Heydenfeldt to serve with the 7th U-boat Flotilla from 27 April 1940 to 1 June for crew training and operationally until she was sunk on 1 July. She sank one Allied ship, claiming .

Design
German Type VIIB submarines were preceded by the shorter Type VIIA submarines. U-102 had a displacement of  when at the surface and  while submerged. She had two shafts and two  propellers.

U-102 was fitted with five  torpedo tubes (four fitted at the bow and one at the stern), fourteen torpedoes, one  SK C/35 naval gun, 220 rounds, and one  anti-aircraft gun. The boat had a complement of between forty-four and sixty.

Service history

U-102s first and only patrol began on 22 June 1940.

43 men died with the submarine; there were no survivors.

After the U-boat's sinking, Vansittart rescued the 26 survivors from Clearton.

Previously Recorded Fate
U-102 was originally believed to have been sunk in the Bay of Biscay due to unknown causes on or after 30 June 1940.

Summary of raiding history

References

Bibliography

External links

German Type VIIB submarines
U-boats commissioned in 1940
U-boats sunk in 1940
World War II submarines of Germany
World War II shipwrecks in the Atlantic Ocean
1940 ships
Ships built in Kiel
U-boats sunk by depth charges
U-boats sunk by British warships
Ships lost with all hands